The 2012–13 North Florida Ospreys men's basketball team represented the University of North Florida during the 2012–13 NCAA Division I men's basketball season. The Ospreys, led by fourth year head coach Matthew Driscoll, played their home games at the UNF Arena and were members of the Atlantic Sun Conference. They finished the season 13–19, 8–10 in A-Sun play to finish in a tie for seventh place. They lost in the quarterfinals of the Atlantic Sun tournament to Florida Gulf Coast.

Roster

Schedule
 
|-
!colspan=9| Exhibition

|-
!colspan=9| Regular season

|-
!colspan=9| 2013 Atlantic Sun men's basketball tournament

References

North Florida Ospreys men's basketball seasons
North Florida
North Florida
North Florida